The Wiesbadener Kurier (also known as the WK) is a regional, daily newspaper published by the Wiesbadener Kurier GmbH & Co. Verlag und Druckerei KG for the area in and around the state capital of Hesse, Wiesbaden in Germany.

The newspaper was created in 1945.

References

External links 
  

Daily newspapers published in Germany
German-language newspapers
Newspapers established in 1945
Mass media in Wiesbaden